The Golden Band is a studio album by the indie rock band the American Analog Set, released in 1999 on Emperor Jones Records.

Critical reception
Exclaim! thought that "at last, the band has created melodies and bewitching atmospheres that enhance, rather than negatively emphasise, their deliberate lack of dynamics." The Chicago Tribune noted that the band was moving away from the influence of Stereolab and the Chills, and wrote that "they play brief, unhurried songs and delicate, vibraphone-textured instrumentals that flow dreamily into each other." Texas Monthly opined that "the group's careful silences and hypnotic guitar-vocal motifs could add up to nothing more than a pleasing ambience, but the band transcends the surfaces."

AllMusic wrote that "the record insinuates itself on the strength of a subtly expanded emotional palette which lends a haunting new dimension to the group's fragile beauty."

Track listing

References

1999 albums
The American Analog Set albums